Hirschsprung is a village and a former municipality in the eastern Ore Mountains in Saxony, Germany. Since 1965 it has been part of the town of Altenberg.

History

Foundation 
First documented writing about the area around is dated 1464. It was signed by the knight Walzig at his castle Bärenstein. In 1491 a road from Altenberg on Dippoldiswalde to Dresden has been created. The settlement is mentioned in old documents in 1747 as Hirschbrunn and Hirschsprung. The first house of settlement was a forester's house.

New Age 
In times of GDR Hirschsprung was a popular recreational area. At that time there were five hotels and a number of guesthouses and apartments. At peak times, 350 accommodations were available. After German reunification, most of them were closed. Today the only remaining hotel and restaurant is Ladenmühle, which is among the oldest buildings in general. There is a Sawmill which has a historical Framesaw.

Sports 
 Altenberg bobsleigh, luge, and skeleton track ("Rennschlitten- und Bobbahn Altenberg" - RSBB)
 Ski-Jump Riesengrundschanze (no longer active)

Demographics

Voluntary associations 
 Heimatförderverein Hirschsprung e.V. (founded in 2001)
 Volunteer fire department Altenberg - Firefighter group Hirschsprung
 Erzgebirgsverein - Zweigverein Geising / Hirschsprung

References

External links 
 Homepage of Hirschsprung

Former municipalities in Saxony
Altenberg, Saxony